The 1989–90 BBL season was the third season of the British Basketball League (known as the Carlsberg League for sponsorship reasons) since its establishment in 1987. The season featured a total of just eight teams, playing 28 games each. Due to the low number of teams, the post-season play-offs featured only the top four teams from the regular season instead of the usual top eight finishers.
The future of the league was in the balance due to the waning number of teams. Livingston folded, Crystal Palace and Hemel Hempstead Watford Royals both dropped to the National League and Glasgow Rangers moved back to Kingston. There was small consolation in the formation of a new club called London Docklands (formerly Tower Hamlets) which joined the league.

Kingston completed a clean sweep of all four trophies claiming the title and play-off crown, as well as the National Cup and NatWest League Trophy. 
Oldham Celtics secured the second tier league title for a second consecutive year.

Carlsberg League (Tier 1)

Final standings

Play-offs

Semi-finals

Third place

Final

National League Division 1 (Tier 2)

Final standings

National League Division 2 (Tier 3)

Final standings

Coca-Cola National Cup

Quarter-finals

Semi-finals

Final

NatWest Trophy

Group stage 
North Group
South Group

Semi-finals 
Manchester Giants vs. Sunderland 76ers

Kingston vs. Bracknell Tigers

Final

Seasonal awards 
 Most Valuable Player: Clyde Vaughan (Sunderland 76ers)
 Coach of the Year: Kevin Cadle (Kingston)
 All-Star Team:
 Alton Byrd (Kingston)
 Kris Kearney (Manchester Giants)
 Dale Roberts (Bracknell Tigers)
 Russ Saunders (Sunderland 76ers)
 Peter Scantlebury (Bracknell Tigers)
 Kenny Scott (Derby Rams)
 Tom Seaman (Bracknell Tigers)
 Mike Spaid (Solent Stars)
 Clyde Vaughan (Sunderland 76ers)
 Scott Wilke (Sunderland 76ers)

References 

British Basketball League seasons
1
British